McClintock Ridge is a prominent east–west ridge that is ice-covered,  north of Rubin Peak in the Carnegie Range of the Churchill Mountains, Antarctica. The ridge was named by the Advisory Committee on Antarctic Names after Barbara McClintock of the Department of Genetics, Carnegie Institution, Cold Spring Harbor, New York, 1942–67, although she continued full-time research, supported by Carnegie, until her death. McClintock was awarded the Nobel Prize in Physiology or Medicine in 1983.

References

Ridges of the Ross Dependency
Shackleton Coast